Robert T. Kuhn (born April 5, 1937) was the 11th president of the Lutheran Church–Missouri Synod (LCMS), having held that office from March to August 2001. He currently serves as the East-Southeast Region Vice President of the LCMS.

Prior to serving as synodical president, Kuhn served as pastor of various congregations, president of the Central Illinois District of the LCMS from 1989 to 1995, and First Vice President of the LCMS from September 1995 through March 2001. He resides in Oviedo, Florida.

References

Concordia Historical Institute

Presidents of the Lutheran Church–Missouri Synod
1937 births
Living people
20th-century American Lutheran clergy
Clergy from Saint Paul, Minnesota
People from Oviedo, Florida